The 1st Infantry Division "Superga" was an infantry division of the Royal Italian Army during World War II. The Superga was classified as a mountain infantry division, which meant that the division's artillery was moved by pack mules instead of the horse-drawn carriages of line infantry divisions. Italy's real mountain warfare divisions were the six alpine divisions manned by Alpini mountain troops. The Superga recruited primarily from central Piedmont and was based, together with its two infantry regiments, in Turin, while the 5th Artillery Regiment was based in Venaria Reale. The division was and named for the Superga hill near Turin, where members of Italy's Royal House of Savoy were buried in the Basilica of Superga.

History 
The division's lineage begins with the Brigade "Basilicata" established in Naples on 1 November 1884 with the 91st and 92nd infantry regiments.

World War I 
The brigade fought on the Italian front in World War I. In October 1926 the brigade assumed the name of I Infantry Brigade and received the 90th Infantry Regiment "Salerno" from the disbanded Brigade "Salerno". The brigade was the infantry component of the 1st Territorial Division of Torino, which also included the 5th Artillery Regiment. In 1934 the division changed its name to 1st Infantry Division "Superga". On 25 March 1939 the division ceded the 90th Infantry Regiment "Salerno" to the 5th Infantry Division "Cosseria". On 5 April of the same year the I Infantry Brigade was dissolved and the two remaining infantry regiments came under direct command of the division, and the 91st and 92nd infantry regiments and 5th Artillery Regiment changed their names to "Superga".

World War II 
On 10 June 1940 the Superga participated in the invasion of France. The Superga advanced to the French village of Argentière on 21 June 1940, reaching the Battaileres pass and the Argentiere summit on 22 June 1940. On 24 June 1940, just before the armistice, the Division attacked the Ouvrage Pas du Roc fort in the Alpine Line. Supported by its neighboring fort Ouvrage Arrondaz and others, the fort repelled the attack.

In August 1941 the division moved to Naples. On 23 November 1941 the Superga was ordered to reorganize as an auto-transportable division of the North-African type for the planned invasion of Malta scheduled for summer 1942. The reorganization got underway in March 1942, with the division's units based in Formia and Gaeta, while the division's headquarter moved to Avola in Sicily for the planning of the assault on Malta.

In November 1942 the Superga was sent to Tunisia during the Run for Tunis and landed in Bizerte on 11 November 1942. By 20 November 1942 it was assembling at Enfidaville Airfield. By 1 December 1942 the Superga together with the L Special Brigade had moved to Sousse-Sfax area. From late January 1943 until 4 February 1943 it repelled an Anglo-American assault in the Oued el Koukat depression. The second assault on the positions of the Superga started on 23 February 1943. The Superga surrendered to the British forces on 12 May 1943.

Organization 
  1st Infantry Division "Superga", in Turin
 91st Infantry Regiment "Superga", in Turin
 Command Company
 3x Fusilier battalions
 Support Weapons Company (65/17 infantry support guns)
 Mortar Company (81mm Mod. 35 mortars)
 92nd Infantry Regiment "Superga", in Turin
 Command Company
 3x Fusilier battalions
 Support Weapons Company (65/17 infantry support guns)
 Mortar Company (81mm Mod. 35 mortars)
 5th Artillery Regiment "Superga", in Venaria Reale
 Command Unit
 I Group (100/17 howitzers; disbanded in 1942)
 II Group (100/17 howitzers; disbanded in 1942)
 III Group (75/27 field guns; motorized and equipped with 75/18 Mod. 35 howitzers in 1942)
 IV Group (75/27 field guns; motorized and equipped with 75/18 Mod. 35 howitzers in 1942)
 LXV Group (100/17 howitzers; joined in January 1943)
 Ammunition and Supply Unit
 CI Self-propelled Anti-tank Battalion (47/32 L40 self-propelled guns; added for the Tunisian campaign)
 CI Anti-aircraft Group (activated for the Tunisian campaign)
 21st Anti-aircraft Battery (20/65 Mod. 35 anti-aircraft guns)
 34th Anti-aircraft Battery (20/65 Mod. 35 anti-aircraft guns)
 301st Anti-aircraft Battery (20/65 Mod. 35 anti-aircraft guns; added for the Tunisian campaign)
 I Mortar Battalion (81mm Mod. 35 mortars)
 CI Mixed Engineer Battalion (formed in 1942)
 1st Anti-tank Company (47/32 anti-tank guns)
 1st Telegraph and Radio Operators Company (entered the CI Mixed Engineer Battalion in 1942)
 14th Engineer Company (entered the CI Mixed Engineer Battalion in 1942)
 123rd Transport Section
 7th Medical Section
 4x Field hospitals
 1x Surgical unit
 21st Supply Section
 1st Truck Section (disbanded in 1942)
 1st Carabinieri Section
 2nd Carabinieri Section
 80th Field Post Office

Attached during the invasion of France in 1940:
 XVIII CC.NN. Battalion

The XVIII CC.NN. Battalion was replaced in summer 1940 by the 2nd CC.NN. Legion, which left the division when the Superga moved to Naples in 1941:
 2nd CC.NN. Legion "Alpina"
 Command Company
 I CC.NN. Battalion
 II CC.NN. Battalion
 2nd CC.NN. Machine Gun Company

Attached during the Tunisian campaign in 1942-43:
 Marine Infantry Regiment "San Marco"
 Command Company
 Battalion "Bafile"
 Battalion "Grado"
 10th Bersaglieri Regiment
 Command Company
 XVI Auto-transported Bersaglieri Battalion
 XXXIV Auto-transported Bersaglieri Battalion
 XXXV Auto-transported Bersaglieri Battalion
 10th Anti-tank Company (47/32 anti-tank guns)
 Assault Grouping
 Command Company
 Formations Group "A" (Arab volunteers)
 Assault Battalion "T" (Italians living in Tunisia)
 Tunisian Volunteers Regiment (raised in December 1942)
 Command Company
 3x battalions (I, II, III; reduced to I and XI battalions in March 1943)

Commanding officers 
The division's commanding officers were:

 Generale di Divisione Curio Barbasetti di Prun (7 September 1939 - 9 September 1940)
 Generale di Divisione Dante Lorenzelli (10 September 1940 - 22 December 1942) 
 Generale di Divisione Ferdinando Gelich (23 December 1942 - 12 May 1943)

Notes

References 

 

Infantry divisions of Italy in World War II
Military units and formations established in 1940
Military units and formations disestablished in 1943